Al-Damiri (1341–1405), the common name of Kamal al-Din Muhammad ibn Musa al-Damiri, was an Arab Muslim writer from Egypt on canon law and natural history.

He wrote the first work to elaborate systematically Arabic zoological knowledge.

Life
Al-Damiri belonged to one of the two towns called Damira near Damietta and spent his life in Egypt. Of the Shafiite school of law, he became professor of tradition in the Rukniyya at Cairo, and also at the mosque al-Azhar; in connection with this work he wrote a commentary on the Minhāj al-Ṭalibīn of Al-Nawawi.

Al-Damiri is, however, better known in the history of literature for his Life of Animals (Ḥayāt al-ḥayawān al-kubrā, 1371), which treats in alphabetic order of 931 animals mentioned in the Quran, the traditions and the poetical and proverbial literature of the Arabs. The work is a compilation from over 500 prose writers and nearly 200 poets. The correct spelling of the names of the animals is given with an explanation of their meanings. The use of the animals in medicine, their lawfulness or unlawfulness as food, their position in folklore are the main subjects treated, while occasionally long irrelevant sections on political history are introduced.

The work exists in three forms. The fullest has been published several times in Egypt; a mediate and a short recension exist in manuscript. Several editions have been made at various times of extracts, among them the poetical one by al-Suyuti, which was translated into Latin by Abraham Ecchelensis (Paris, 1667). Bochartus in his Hierozoicon (1663) used al-Damiri's work. There is a translation of the whole into English by Lieutenant-Colonel Jayakar (Bombay, 1906–1908).

Notes

External links

1344 births
1405 deaths
Egyptian writers
Zoologists of the medieval Islamic world
14th-century Arabs